Best Enemies Forever is a 2016 Italian comedy film directed by Luca Lucini.

Cast
Margherita Buy as Lucia
Claudia Gerini as Fabiola
Giampaolo Morelli as Giacomo
Paolo Calabresi as Stefano
Gigio Morra as Attilio
Lucia Ragni as Mrs. Innocenti
Andrea Bosca as Ruggero
Mihaela Irina Dorlan as Ambra
Jasper Cabal as Paolo Jr.

References

External links

2016 films
Films directed by Luca Lucini
2010s Italian-language films
2016 comedy films
Italian comedy films
2010s Italian films